Albion is the fifth solo studio album by British singer-songwriter Ginger Wildheart, frontman of rock band The Wildhearts. Albion was first released via the PledgeMusic platform as a 15-track LP. It came following the success of Ginger's 2012 album 555%.

A commercial ten-track version was later released via Cargo Records and Round Records. The album, which was originally going to be titled Practical Musician, was recorded in 2013, and a blog of the album sessions was published online.

Critical reception

Classic Rock described Albion as "spinetingling" and gave it four out of five stars. Drowned in Sound gave the album 7 out of 10 stars, calling it "another step on Ginger’s loveably tumultuous, often volatile, refreshingly bittersweet and often transcendental musical journey."

Track listing
Commercial version

Personnel

Ginger Wildheart – vocals, guitars
Chris Catalyst – vocals, guitars, percussion, bass, harmonium
Denzel – drums
Rich Jones – guitars, vocals
Victoria Liedtke – vocals
Random Jon Poole – bass, guitar, vocals, keyboards
Bryan Scary – piano, harmonium, vocals and string arrangements

References 

2014 albums
Ginger (musician) albums